Sofiane Alakouch (born 29 July 1998) is a professional footballer who plays as a right-back for Ligue 2 club Metz. Born in France, he plays for the Morocco national team.

Club career
On 21 July 2021, Alakouch joined Metz for a four-year term. On 15 February 2022, he joined Lausanne-Sport in Switzerland on loan until the end of the season.

International career
Alakouch is of Moroccan descent and represented France at U19 level. He received a call-up to represent the Morocco national team in August 2017. He later received a call-up to represent the France under-20 national team for the 2018 Toulon Tournament on 17 May 2018.

Alakouch debuted with Morocco in a 3–0 2022 FIFA World Cup qualification win over Sudan on 12 November 2021.

References

External links
France profile at FFF

1998 births
Living people
Footballers from Nîmes
Moroccan footballers
Morocco international footballers
French footballers
France youth international footballers
France under-21 international footballers
French sportspeople of Moroccan descent
Association football fullbacks
JS Chemin Bas d'Avignon players
Nîmes Olympique players
FC Metz players
FC Lausanne-Sport players
Ligue 1 players
Ligue 2 players
Championnat National 2 players
Championnat National 3 players
Swiss Super League players
2021 Africa Cup of Nations players
Moroccan expatriate footballers
Expatriate footballers in Switzerland
Moroccan expatriate sportspeople in Switzerland
French expatriate sportspeople in Switzerland
French expatriate footballers